Kamil Eltayeb Idris (born on 26 August 1954) is a Sudanese statesman, scholar and international civil servant. He was Director General of the World Intellectual Property Organization (WIPO) from November 1997 to September 2008. He was also head of the International Union for the Protection of New Varieties of Plants (UPOV). Idris stepped down a year early from his post as head of WIPO, amidst "allegations he misled WIPO about his age".

Education 
According to a document prepared by the Office of the UPOV, Kamil Idris holds a Bachelor of Law (LLB) from Khartoum University, Sudan, a Bachelor of Arts in Philosophy, Political Science and Economic Theories from Cairo University, Egypt, a Master in International Law and International Affairs from Ohio University, United States, and a Doctorate in International Law from the Graduate Institute of International Studies, University of Geneva, Switzerland. Franklin Pierce Law Center in the United States awarded Idris an honorary Doctorate of Laws degree in May 1999. In 2005, Idris received an honorary Doctor of Letters from Indira Gandhi National Open University in India.

Career

Idris joined WIPO on 30 December 1982. Idris was member of the International Law Commission from 1992 to 1996 and from 2000 to 2001. On 22 September 1997 he was appointed Director General of WIPO for a period of six years. Idris succeeded Árpád Bogsch, who served as Director General for 25 years. The Director General oversees WIPO's efforts for global intellectual property protection. In March 1998, Idris visited the United States Congress and met with the United States Secretary of Commerce to discuss safeguarding and promoting American ingenuity, and he received an official welcome by Congress. He was formally re-appointed to a second six-year term as Director General of WIPO on 27 May 2003. Throughout his tenure as Director Genera, Idris donated his salary as Secretary-General of the Union for the Protection of Plant Varieties (UPOV) to developing countries. His mandate was originally due to end on 30 November 2009. A WIPO document released in 2016 indicate that in 2007, Idris requested that the WIPO Coordination Committee advance the process for appointing his replacement, whose appointment began October 2008.

In 2010, Idris was an independent candidate for President of Sudan.

Controversy 
In 2006, a report conducted by WIPO's Internal Audit and Oversight Division at the request of the United Nations Joint Inspection Unit showed Idris' age had been misrepresented was the information was leaked to media outlets. Earlier WIPO records showed Idris' date of birth to be 26 August 1945, but he had attempted to change his records to show he was born on 26 August 1954. On 21 September 2007 the Secretariat of the WIPO called the report "a deliberate intention to harm [Idris]" and criticized the report's legitimacy and failure of the author to follow procedure which compromised its confidential status. Idris' birthday has been reported as possibly being 26 August 1945, 26 August 1953 or 26 August 1954.

During the 10-day WIPO general assembly that ended on 3 October 2007, a move to remove Idris from his position was blocked. WIPO came under fire for its credibility. Idris agreed to resign, and stepped down a year early from his post as head of WIPO.

In December 2016, it was reported that documents from WIPO dated in 2010 signed by the legal counsel of the organization, Edward Kwakwa, were released which show that Idris did not misrepresent his birth date.

Awards and honors
Idris is an Honorary Fellow at Durham University in the United Kingdom. He also serves as an Honorary Professor of Law at Peking University and holds an Honorary Doctorate from Fudan University in China. 

In 1999, Idris was awarded an honorary medal from the Moscow State Institute of International Relations for his work in intellectual property. In 2001, Idris was awarded the Grand Cross of the Infante D. Henrique, and, in 2002, he also received the title of Doctor Honoris Causa in recognition of his contribution to the development of cooperation in the field of intellectual property.

In 2004, Sultan Qaboos bin Said granted Idris with the Order of Oman, and the city of Venice, Italy also granted him the first-ever Venice Award for Intellectual Property. 

Idris was decorated with the Orden de Aguila Azteca in 2005 for his work in Mexico’s economic development. The following year, the African Regional Intellectual Property Organization (ARIPO) named its new regional intellectual property training center after Dr. Idris.

Bibliography

References 

Cairo University alumni
Ohio University alumni
Living people
1954 births
World Intellectual Property Organization people
International Law Commission officials
Sudanese diplomats
Sudanese civil servants
University of Khartoum alumni
University of Geneva alumni
Graduate Institute of International and Development Studies alumni
Sudanese officials of the United Nations
Members of the International Law Commission